Mississippi Highway 609 (MS 609) is a  north-south state highway in Jackson County in the Mississippi Gulf Coast region of Mississippi, consisting of two sections. The first is signed along Washington Avenue between US Highway 90 (US 90) and Interstate 10 (I-10), and the second is unsigned and continues north from Latimer at Old Biloxi Road to Vestry Road in Vestry.

Route description

The signed section of MS 609 begins in Ocean Springs at an intersection with US 90, with the road continuing south into downtown. MS 609 heads north along Washington Avenue as a four-lane undivided highway through a neighborhood before crossing the Fort Bayou Drawbridge over Old Fort Bayou into the neighboring community of Gulf Hills. The highway passes by a golf course and through a mix of a business district and neighborhoods for several blocks before crossing Lemoyne Boulevard where it begins to straddle the border of St. Martin and Gulf Hills. It now passes a major business district before meeting I-10 at an interchange (exit 50). State maintenance continues a short distance further along Tucker Road until ending at the next intersection with Cook Road and Seaman Road on the border of Latimer.

Tucker Road, which later becomes Old Biloxi Road, continues through Latimer as a local road. After crossing Bayou Costapia, the MS 609 officially resumes, but the highway is not signed as such and is not maintained by the state. The highway leaves Latimer to a less populated area for the next several miles as it travels through the remote wooded terrain of the De Soto National Forest, with very few homes and businesses in the vicinity of the highway. Within the forest, the highway passes through Larue. The northern segment does not intersect any other state highways.

Major intersections

References

External links

609
Transportation in Jackson County, Mississippi